Gerson Elías Acevedo Rojas (born April 5, 1988) is a Chilean former footballer.

Career

Club
Acevedo made his professional debut in 2006 for Colo-Colo.
Whilst playing for Mordovia, Acevedo won the 2011-12 Football Championship of the National League.
On 12 June 2016, Acevedo signed a two-year contract with Kazakhstan Premier League side FC Kairat.

On 10 August 2017, Acevedo left Deportes Iquique.

On 3 March 2019, Acevedo signed for Alashkert.

On 11 March 2020, Deportes Recoleta announced the signing of Acevedo.

International
Acevedo has represented Chile internationally at the national U-17 team and national U-20 team levels.

Career statistics

Club

Honours

Club
Colo-Colo
 Primera División de Chile (2): 2007 Apertura, 2007 Clausura

References

External links
 BDFA profile

1988 births
Living people
People from Santiago
People from Santiago Province, Chile
People from Santiago Metropolitan Region
Footballers from Santiago
Chilean footballers
Chile youth international footballers
Chile under-20 international footballers
Chile international footballers
Chilean expatriate footballers
Association football midfielders
Colo-Colo footballers
Unión Española footballers
Puerto Montt footballers
C.D. Antofagasta footballers
FC Ural Yekaterinburg players
FC Mordovia Saransk players
FC Kairat players
Deportes Iquique footballers
FK Sūduva Marijampolė players
FC Alashkert players
Deportes Recoleta footballers
Chilean Primera División players
Russian First League players
Russian Premier League players
Kazakhstan Premier League players
A Lyga players
Armenian Premier League players
Segunda División Profesional de Chile players
Chilean expatriate sportspeople in Russia
Expatriate footballers in Russia
Chilean expatriate sportspeople in Kazakhstan
Expatriate footballers in Kazakhstan
Chilean expatriate sportspeople in Lithuania
Expatriate footballers in Lithuania
Expatriate footballers in Armenia